Xavier Picard (born 1962, Reims) is a French animation director. His most notable animation credits include the feature film Moomins on the Riviera (2014), and the TV-series Odd Family (2005), Marcelino Pan y Vino (2001), Littlest Pet Shop (1995) and the animation series King Arthur and the Knights of Justice (1992). In 2019, he worked on Jean-François Laguionie's Le Voyage du Prince.

References

External links
 
https://web.archive.org/web/20180924062627/http://www.pictak.com/

1962 births
Living people
French animated film directors
French television directors
Mass media people from Reims